Gulliver Mickey is a black and white short cartoon in the Mickey Mouse series, produced by Walt Disney and released by United Artists in 1934. It was the 66th Mickey Mouse short film to be released, and the fourth of that year.

Plot
Mickey is first seen reading Gulliver's Travels, the 1726 novel by Jonathan Swift, while the mice orphan children are pretending to be sailors. He then joins in their play by hiding under the rug, pretending to be a whale. After poking Mickey with a fork, causing their “ship” to collapse, the children start to cry. Mickey manages to calm them down by retelling the Liliput sequences of Gulliver's Travels, pretending it was a real event that happened to him by portraying the role of Gulliver. The story ends with Mickey saving the town from a giant spider (Pete). However, after telling the story, one of the children dangles a fake spider attached to a fishing rod, which scares Mickey out of his wits.

As soon as Mickey had managed to struggle to be free from the spider's long legs, he immediately gets the spider away. But in Mickey's story, he is battling a cushion making feathers fly everywhere!

Legacy
This short would later be adapted as part of the Timeless River world in Kingdom Hearts II as a mission where Sora, Donald Duck and Goofy protect the town from the Heartless, led by one attacking from an airplane.

Voice cast
 Mickey Mouse: Walt Disney
 Pluto: Pinto Colvig
 Mickey's Nephews: Marcellite Garner
 Giant Spider: Billy Sheets

Home media
The short was released on December 2, 2002, on Walt Disney Treasures: Mickey Mouse in Black and White.

See also
Mickey Mouse (film series)

References

External links
 

1934 films
1934 animated films
1930s Disney animated short films
Mickey Mouse short films
American black-and-white films
Films about spiders
Films based on Gulliver's Travels
Films directed by Burt Gillett
Films produced by Walt Disney
Films scored by Frank Churchill
1930s English-language films
1930s American films